Bermondsey was a borough constituency centred on the Bermondsey district of South London, England.  It returned one Member of Parliament (MP) to the House of Commons of the Parliament of the United Kingdom. Elections were held using the first-past-the-post voting system.

The constituency was created for the 1885 general election and abolished for the 1918 general election, when almost all its territory was represented by the new Bermondsey West and a very small amount going into the existing Rotherhithe constituency.

A new Bermondsey constituency was created for the 1950 general election including Rotherhithe, was and abolished for the 1983 election, when it was largely replaced by the new Southwark and Bermondsey constituency.

History
The 1983 by-election was one of the most bitterly contested by-elections in the United Kingdom as it involved Bob Mellish, the retired Labour MP, running a highly personal and homophobic campaign against the Labour candidate, Peter Tatchell. The result was the election of Simon Hughes as a Liberal in a former Labour stronghold.

Boundaries
1950–1974: The Municipal Borough of Bermondsey.

1974–1983: The London Borough of Southwark wards of Abbey, Bricklayers, Browning, Cathedral, Chaucer, Dockyard, Riverside, and Rotherhithe.

Members of Parliament

MPs 1885–1918

MPs 1950–1983

Election results

Elections in the 1880s

Elections in the 1890s

Elections in the 1900s

Elections in the 1910s

Elections in the 1950s

Elections in the 1960s

Elections in the 1970s

Elections in the 1980s

Note: Esmond Bevan made a mistake and inserted his occupation rather than politics in the nomination paper. He was an Independent Labour candidate.

References

Sources 
Richard Kimber's Political Science Resources: UK General Elections since 1832

Parliamentary constituencies in London (historic)
Constituencies of the Parliament of the United Kingdom established in 1885
Constituencies of the Parliament of the United Kingdom disestablished in 1918
Politics of the London Borough of Southwark
History of the London Borough of Southwark
Constituencies of the Parliament of the United Kingdom established in 1950
Constituencies of the Parliament of the United Kingdom disestablished in 1983
Bermondsey